Marc Minguell Alférez (born 14 January 1985 in Barcelona) is a Spanish water polo player who competed for the Spain men's national water polo team in three consecutive Summer Olympics (2008 Beijing, 2012 London and 2016 Rio. He helped Spanish water polo club CN Atlètic-Barceloneta win the LEN Champions League in 2013–14 season.

See also
 List of World Aquatics Championships medalists in water polo

References

External links
 

1985 births
Living people
Spanish male water polo players
Olympic water polo players of Spain
Water polo players at the 2008 Summer Olympics
Water polo players at the 2012 Summer Olympics
Water polo players at the 2016 Summer Olympics
World Aquatics Championships medalists in water polo
People from Barcelona
Water polo players from Catalonia
21st-century Spanish people